The 2000 NCAA Division I Women's Lacrosse Championship was the 19th annual single-elimination tournament to determine the national champion of Division I NCAA women's college lacrosse. The championship game was played at Lions Stadium in Trenton, New Jersey during May 2000. All NCAA Division I women's lacrosse programs were eligible for this championship. Ultimately, 12 teams were invited to the tournament.

Maryland defeated Princeton, 16–8, to win their eighth overall and sixth consecutive, national championship. This would subsequently become the sixth of Maryland's record seven straight national titles (1995–2001). 

For the second consecutive year, the leading scorer for the tournament was Jen Adams from Maryland, with 22 goals. Adams was also again named the tournament's Most Outstanding Player.

Teams

Tournament bracket

All-tournament team 
Alivian Coates, James Madison
Kristin Hagart, Loyola (MD)
Jess Marion, James Madison
Stacey Moriand, Loyola (MD)
Jen Adams, Maryland (Most outstanding player)
Christie Jenkins, Maryland
Alex Kahoe, Maryland
Tonia Porras, Maryland
Brooke Owens, Princeton
Julie Shaner, Princeton
Lauren Simone, Princeton

See also
2000 NCAA Division I Men's Lacrosse Championship
2000 NCAA Division II Lacrosse Championship
2000 NCAA Division III Women's Lacrosse Championship

References

NCAA Division I Women's Lacrosse Championship
NCAA Division I Women's Lacrosse Championship
NCAA Women's Lacrosse Championship